†Partula sagitta was a species of air-breathing tropical land snail, a terrestrial pulmonate gastropod mollusk in the family Partulidae. This species was endemic to Tahaa, French Polynesia. It is now extinct.

References

Partula (gastropod)
Extinct gastropods
Taxonomy articles created by Polbot
Gastropods described in 1953